This is a list of terms used in computer chess.
For terms used in chess in general, see Glossary of chess.
For terms used in chess problems, see Glossary of chess problems.

A–M

N–Z

References

 

Glossary
Computer
Wikipedia glossaries using description lists